While a Nation Sleeps is the fifth studio album by Delaware post-hardcore band Boysetsfire. It was released in June 2013 under Bridge 9 Records in the US and End Hits Records in Europe.

Track list
All songs written and performed by Boysetsfire.

References

2013 albums
Bridge 9 Records albums
Boysetsfire albums